The 2003–04 Slovak First Football League (known as the Slovak Corgoň Liga for sponsorship reasons) was the 11th season of first-tier football league in Slovakia, since its establishment in 1993. This season started on 19 July 2003 and ended on 8 June 2004. MŠK Žilina are the defending champions.

Teams
A total of 10 teams was contested in the league, including 9 sides from the 2002–03 season and one promoted from the 2. Liga.

Relegation for 1. FC Košice to the 2003–04 2. Liga was confirmed on 31 May 2003. The one relegated team were replaced by Dukla Banská Bystrica.

Stadiums and locations

League table

Results

First half of season

Second half of season

Season statistics

Top scorers

Awards

Top Eleven

Goalkeeper:  Ján Mucha (Žilina)
Defence:   Radoslav Zabavník,  Dušan Sninský,  Branislav Labant (all Žilina),  Marek Čech (Inter)
Midfield:  Miroslav Barčík (Žilina),  Miroslav Sovič (B.Bystrica),  Juraj Dovičovič (Dubnica),  Ladislav Onofrej (Slovan)
Attack:  Roland Števko (MFK Ružomberok),  Marek Krejčí (Artmedia)

See also
2003–04 Slovak Cup
2003–04 2. Liga (Slovakia)

References

External links
RSSSF.org (Tables and statistics)

Slovak Super Liga seasons
Slovak
1